The rock elm (Ulmus thomasii) is a deciduous tree native primarily to the Midwestern United States.

Rock Elm may also refer to:
 Rock Elm, Nova Scotia, Canada
 Rock Elm, Michigan, United States
 Rock Elm, Wisconsin, United States
 Rock Elm (community), Wisconsin
 Rock Elm Disturbance, an impact crater